TEKE::TEKE is a Canadian psychedelic rock band, whose music blends Japanese rock and surf rock influences. They are most noted for their album Shirushi, which was a longlisted nominee for the 2021 Polaris Music Prize.

The band was formed by guitarist Serge Nakauchi Pelletier, trombonist Étienne Lebel and drummer Ian Lettre, originally as a Takeshi Terauchi tribute band, after they discovered Terauchi's music while on tour with rapper Boogat. They added guitarist Hidetaka Yoneyama, bassist Mishka Stein and flautist Yuki Isami and made their live debut in a 2017 show at the  Festival in Montreal; by the time of the band's second show at the Pop Montreal festival, they had added vocalist Maya Kuroki and evolved from a straight Terauchi cover band to performing original material inspired by Japanese eleki music.

Their debut EP Jikaku was released in 2018, and Shirushi, their full-length debut album, was released in May 2021 on Kill Rock Stars.

References

External links

Canadian psychedelic rock music groups
Canadian world music groups
Surf music groups
Musical groups from Montreal
Kill Rock Stars artists
Félix Award winners